The CNA D, often known as the CNA D.4, was a four-cylinder, air-cooled, horizontally opposed engine built in Italy by Compagnia Nazionale Aeronautica (CNA) between 1940 and 1951 to power light aircraft.

Applications
Data from Erickson 
 Adam RA-14 Loisirs
 Ambrosini SAI.10
 CNA PM.1
 CNA MPL
 CVV Tartuca
 Druine Condor
 GCA Pedro
 GCA Etabeta
 Lombardi FL.3
 Lombardi FL.5
 Lombardi FL.7
 Macchi MB.308
 Viberti Muscal

Specifications

See also

References

CNA aircraft engines
1930s aircraft piston engines
Boxer engines